Ferdinand Gotthold Max Eisenstein (16 April 1823 – 11 October 1852) was a German mathematician. He specialized in number theory and analysis, and proved several results that eluded even Gauss. Like Galois and Abel before him, Eisenstein died before the age of 30. He was born and died in Berlin, Prussia.

Early life
His parents, Johann Konstantin Eisenstein and Helene Pollack, were of Jewish descent and converted to Protestantism prior to his birth. From an early age, he demonstrated talent in mathematics and music. As a young child he learned to play piano, and he continued to play and compose for piano throughout his life.

He suffered various health problems throughout his life, including meningitis as an infant, a disease that took the lives of all five of his brothers and sisters. In 1837, at the age of 14, he enrolled at Friedrich Wilhelm Gymnasium, and soon thereafter at Friedrich Werder Gymnasium in Berlin. His teachers recognized his talents in mathematics, but by 15 years of age he had already learned all the material taught at the school. He then began to study differential calculus from the works of Leonhard Euler and Joseph-Louis Lagrange.

At 17, still a student, Eisenstein began to attend classes given by Peter Gustav Lejeune Dirichlet and others at the University of Berlin. In 1842, before taking his final exams, he traveled with his mother to England, to search for his father. In 1843 he met William Rowan Hamilton in Dublin, who gave him a copy of his book on Niels Henrik Abel's proof of the impossibility of solving fifth-degree polynomials, a work that would stimulate Eisenstein's interest in mathematical research.

Five remarkable years
In 1843 Eisenstein returned to Berlin, where he passed his graduation exams and enrolled in the University the following autumn. In January 1844 he had already presented his first work to the Berlin Academy, on cubic forms in two variables. The same year he met for the first time with Alexander von Humboldt, who would later become Eisenstein's patron. Humboldt managed to find grants from the King, the government of Prussia, and the Berlin academy to compensate for Eisenstein's extreme poverty. The money, always late and grudgingly given, was earned in full measure by Eisenstein: in 1844 alone he published over 23 papers and two problems in Crelle's Journal, including two proofs of the law of quadratic reciprocity, and the analogous laws of cubic reciprocity and quartic reciprocity.

In June 1844 Eisenstein visited Carl Friedrich Gauss in Göttingen. In 1845, Kummer saw to it that he received an honorary doctorate at the University of Breslau. Jacobi also encouraged the distinction, but later relations between Jacobi and Eisenstein were always rocky, due primarily to a disagreement over the order of discoveries made in 1846. In 1847 Eisenstein habilitated at the University of Berlin, and he began to teach there. Bernhard Riemann attended his classes on elliptic functions.

Imprisonment and death
In 1848 Eisenstein was imprisoned briefly by the Prussian army for his revolutionary activities in Berlin. Eisenstein always had republican sympathies, and while he did not actively participate in the revolution of 1848, he was arrested on 19 March of that year. Although he was released just one day later, the harsh treatment he suffered damaged his already delicate health. But his association with the Republican cause led to his official stipends being revoked, despite Humboldt tenaciously coming to his defense.

Despite his health, Eisenstein continued writing papers on quadratic partitions of prime numbers and the reciprocity laws. In 1851, at the instigation of Gauss, he was elected to the Academy of Göttingen; one year later, this time at the recommendation of Dirichlet, he was also elected to the Academy of Berlin.

He died of tuberculosis at the age of 29. Humboldt, then 83, accompanied his remains to the cemetery. He had recently obtained, too late, as it turned out, the funding necessary to send Eisenstein on holiday to Sicily.

Purported Gauss quote

E. T. Bell in his 1937 book Men of Mathematics (page 237) claims that Gauss said "There have been but three epoch-making mathematicians, Archimedes, Newton, and Eisenstein", and this has been widely quoted in writings about Eisenstein.

Although it is doubtful that Gauss really put Eisenstein in the same league as Newton, his writings show that Gauss thought very highly of Eisenstein. For example, a letter from Gauss to Humboldt, dated the 14th of April in 1846, says that Eisenstein's talent is one that nature bestows only a few times a century ("welche die Natur in jedem Jahrhundert nur wenigen erteilt").

Publications

 Weil's review

Eponym concepts
 Eisenstein's criterion
 Eisenstein ideal
 Eisenstein integer
 Eisenstein prime
 Eisenstein reciprocity
 Eisenstein sum
 Eisenstein series
 Eisenstein's theorem
 Eisenstein triple
 Eisenstein–Kronecker number
 Real analytic Eisenstein series

See also
 Elliptic Gauss sum

References

Further reading

External links

 
 The life of Gotthold Ferdinand Eisenstein by M.Schmitz  (PDF format)
 Ferdinand Eisenstein by Larry Freeman (2005), Fermat's Last Theorem Blog.

1823 births
1852 deaths
19th-century German people
19th-century German mathematicians
Number theorists
Humboldt University of Berlin alumni
Academic staff of the Humboldt University of Berlin
German Christians
German people of Jewish descent
German Protestants
Scientists from Berlin
19th-century deaths from tuberculosis
Tuberculosis deaths in Germany